The  Dallas Cowboys season was the franchise's 31st season in the National Football League (NFL) and was the second year of the franchise under the ownership of Jerry Jones and head coach Jimmy Johnson. The Cowboys rebounded from a 1–15 season in 1989 to a 7–9 record. However, the Cowboys missed the playoffs for the fifth consecutive season. Despite this, Jimmy Johnson won AP's NFL coach of the year honors.

Summary 
The season began with a win over San Diego, breaking a 14-game home losing streak. The Cowboys showed some early season fight with two wins over Tampa Bay and a near-miss against Philadelphia, but still stood only 3–7 after ten weeks, and were seemingly out of playoff contention. However, the team improved significantly in late November, winning four games in a row (including impressive wins over the Redskins and Saints, and a blowout win over the Cardinals). The Cowboys entered the season's final two weeks needing only one win or Saints' loss to make the playoffs as a wildcard. However, in Week 16, quarterback Troy Aikman separated his shoulder early against the Eagles and was replaced by Babe Laufenberg (the Cowboys had traded backup Steve Walsh early in the season and Laufenberg was elevated from third string to backup). With Aikman injured, the Cowboys mustered little offense against the Eagles and lost, 17–3. Meanwhile, the Saints upset the 49ers (handing the Niners only their second loss) to keep the Cowboys from clinching in Week 16. The next week, with Laufenberg again leading the offense, the Cowboys were thoroughly beaten, 26–7, by the 4–11 Atlanta Falcons. When the Saints beat the Rams the next night, the Cowboys were eliminated from playoff contention.

This season featured the debut of running back Emmitt Smith. Smith held out during training camp and was only a minimal contributor in the season's early games, but began to show his future greatness with a 100+ yard performance in a Week 5 win against Tampa Bay and had a few other outstanding games during the season.

Because of the dismal 1-15 record from the previous season, the home opener against the San Diego Chargers was threatened to be blacked out for the local television market, since Texas Stadium was not sold out. A local radio station ended up buying all of the unsold tickets so that the game could be broadcast to the local DFW market.

Offseason

NFL draft

Regular season

Schedule 

Note: Intra-division opponents are in bold text.

Standings

Roster

Season summary

Porkchop Bowl 

The Porkchop Bowl was the NFL matchup between the Philadelphia Eagles and Dallas Cowboys which followed the infamous Bounty Bowl II.

Even though almost a year had transpired since the notorious "Bounty Bowl" games, the vitriolic rivalry between the two teams was still firmly in Cowboys fans' memories. And this was the first encounter since Cowboys players and coaches were relentlessly pelted by snowballs during that last meeting at Philadelphia's Veterans Stadium.

The week before game day in Dallas, Philadelphia head coach Buddy Ryan and Ted Plumb, his offensive coordinator, were out for dinner. Coach Ryan was dining on pork chops and started to choke. Plumb quickly initiated the Heimlich maneuver and saved Ryan's life. Word of the incident spread in Dallas, and hatred by Dallas fans was so fevered towards Ryan that former Cowboys' president Tex Schramm dubbed the pending game on October 28 the "Porkchop Bowl." When the game began, Dallas fans tossed pork chops and similar simulated meat products from the stands toward the Eagles bench.

The final score was 21–20 in favor of the Eagles.

Transactions 
 On September 25, 1990, the Dallas Cowboys traded Steve Walsh to the New Orleans Saints for the Saints' first and third round picks in the 1991 NFL Draft and a second round pick (that could become a first round pick based on performance) in the 1992 NFL Draft.

Awards and records 
 Jimmy Johnson, National Football League Coach of the Year Award
 Emmitt Smith, National Football League Rookie of the Year Award

Publications 
 The Football Encyclopedia 
 Total Football 
 Cowboys Have Always Been My Heroes

References

External links 
 1990 Dallas Cowboys
 Pro Football Hall of Fame
 Dallas Cowboys Official Site

Dallas Cowboys seasons
Dallas
Dallas